The Open class was a sailing event on the Sailing at the 1900 Summer Olympics program in Meulan. All boats intended to compete in other races of the Meulan program were supposed to compete in the Concours d'Honneur (Open class). It was held on 20 May 1900. About seventy–eight sailors, on about forty–seven boats, from six nations competing. The latest finishing time was at 19:00 hours. Only seven boats made it to the finish in time.

Race schedule

Course area and course configuration 
For the Open class the Meulan course area was used.

Weather conditions 
The race was troublesome due to an almost complete absence of any wind. Also the fact that the wind there was came perpendicular to the course (river Seine) and was blocked or diverted by trees and buildings.

Final results

Notes 
Two competitors, “Mamie” and “Carabinier”, were disqualified for using “other means of propulsion than the sail.” This made them the first sailors ever to be disqualified in an Olympic regatta.

Other information 
Yachting World states the races were open to yachts up to 30 tons; however, no 30 ton boats were entered.

Further reading

References 

Open class
Ton class